V. Penelope Pelizzon is an American poet and essayist. Her first poetry collection, Nostos (2000), won the Hollis Summers Prize and the Poetry Society of America’s Norma Farber First Book Award. Her second poetry collection, Whose Flesh Is Flame, Whose Bone Is Time (2014), was a finalist for the Anthony Hecht Poetry Prize. She is also co-author of Tabloid, Inc. (2010), a critical study of film, photography, and crime narratives. She is a professor at the University of Connecticut.

Life
She graduated from University of Massachusetts, Boston, summa cum laude, University of California, Irvine, and University of Missouri in 1998.

She has taught at University of California, Irvine, University of Missouri, Washington and Jefferson College, and University of Connecticut.

Her work has appeared in Poetry, Orion, The Hudson Review, Ecotone, 32 Poems, The Kenyon Review, Field, The New England Review, Narrative, The Harvard Review, The Gettysburg Review, The Missouri Review, Plume, ZYZZYVA,  and Fourth Genre.

She is married to Anthony Deaton, a foreign service officer.

Awards
 2021 Editor's Choice Selection for the Quarterly West Chapbook Award, for Of Vinegar  Of Pearl 2019 Hawthornden Residency Fellowship for poetry
 2012 The Amy Lowell Poetry Travelling Scholarship
 2012 Center for Book Arts chapbook award for Human Field 2008 Lannan Writing Residency Fellowship
 2003 Campbell Corner Poetry Prize
 2001 Norma Farber First Book Award, for Nostos, by Poetry Society of America
 1999 Hollis Summers Prize
 The Kenneth Rexroth Translation Award (for Umberto Saba's poems from Italian)
 1997 The 92nd Street Y's “Discovery”/ The Nation Award

Works
 “Animals & Instruments,” Narrative, Spring 2022. 
 “A Gaze Hound That Hunteth By the Eye,” Plume, issue 120, August 2021.
 “Some Say,” Ecotone no. 28, Spring 2020. 
 “Elegy for Estrogen,” Ecotone, no. 27, spring/summer 2019.
 “Orts & Slarts,” Tin House online, May 2019. 
 The Village Voice, National Poetry Month Feature, 21 April 2015.
 “Light Speaking: Notes on Poetry and Photography.” Poetry, vol. 202, no. 2, May 2013. 
 “Nulla Dies Sine Linea.” Poetry, vol. 200, no. 1, Apr. 2012.
 “Blood Memory.” Poetry, vol. 195, no. 4, Jan. 2010.
 “Seven Penitential Psalms.” Poetry, vol. 187, no. 2, Nov. 2005.
 
 
 Whose Flesh Is Flame, Whose Bone Is Time. The Waywiser Press. 2014. . Pelizzon's second book of poems was a finalist for the Anthony Hecht Poetry Prize.
 “Memoire on the Heliograph.” Fourth Genre, vol. 6, no. 2, 2004.
  Pelizzon's first book of poems won the Hollis Summers Poetry Prize.
  Pelizzon and Nancy M. West discuss tabloid newspapers, especially those of the late 1920s and early 1930s, using a combination of narrative and film theory.

Translation
 “Runic Signature from Cynewulf’s Fates of the Apostles,” with accompanying translator’s note, Poetry,'' vol.198, no. 3, June 2011.

References

Year of birth missing (living people)
Living people
University of Massachusetts Boston alumni
University of California, Irvine alumni
University of Missouri alumni
University of California, Irvine faculty
University of Missouri faculty
University of Connecticut faculty
Washington & Jefferson College faculty
American women poets
American women academics
21st-century American women writers
21st-century American poets